The Ultraviolet Catastrophe is an album by the American band Trotsky Icepick, released in 1991 on SST Records. It featured seven new musicians the band hired in addition to their core quintet.

Track listing
	The Ultra Violet Catastrophe	
	Alphaville	
	The Thing Under The Couch	
	WDBS	
	Barbara Steele	
	Boy W/Book	
	God Without A Compass	
	Venus De Milo	
	Pestilence	
	August August	
	Martian Manhunter	
	Q.E.D.

References

SST Records albums
1991 albums